How to Stuff a Wild Bikini is a 1965 Pathécolor beach party film from American International Pictures.  The sixth entry in a seven-film series, the movie features Mickey Rooney, Annette Funicello, Dwayne Hickman, Brian Donlevy, and Beverly Adams. The film features a brief appearance by Frankie Avalon and includes Buster Keaton in one of his last roles.

Plot
Frankie (Avalon) goes to Tahiti on Naval Reserve duty. While cavorting with local girls, Frankie realizes that Dee Dee (Annette Funicello) might be unfaithful to him. When Frankie seeks help from a witch doctor (Buster Keaton), the witch doctor sends a sea beauty, Cassandra (Beverly Adams), to lure Ricky (Dwayne Hickman), an advertising executive, away from Dee Dee.

Upon Cassandra's arrival, the beach turns upside down, as all the surfers fall for her, an executive wants to make her a model, and Eric Von Zipper (Harvey Lembeck) and his motorcycle gang add to the trouble.

Cast
 Annette Funicello as Dee Dee
 Dwayne Hickman as Ricky
 Brian Donlevy as B. D. (Big Deal) McPherson
 Harvey Lembeck as Eric Von Zipper
 Beverly Adams as Cassandra
 John Ashley as Johnny
 Jody McCrea as Bonehead
 Marianne Gaba as Animal
 Len Lesser as North Dakota Pete
 Irene Tsu as Native Girl
 Arthur Julian as Dr. Melamed
 Bobbi Shaw as Khola Koku
 The Kingsmen as Themselves
 Alberta Nelson as Puss
 Buster Keaton as Bwana
 Mickey Rooney as Peachy (J. Peachmont) Keane
 Frankie Avalon as Frankie
 Michele Carey as Michele
 Elizabeth Montgomery as Bwana's daughter

Production
How to Stuff a Wild Bikini was the last "beach party" film to feature Frankie Avalon and Annette Funicello. Avalon appeared on-screen for about six minutes and interacted only very briefly with Funicello. His small role was attributed to the fact that he was filming another AIP production, 1965's Sergeant Deadhead.

Dwayne Hickman played the male lead, a man trying to woo Funicello's character away from her absent boyfriend. Tommy Kirk was originally announced as the male lead, but shortly before filming, he was arrested for possession of marijuana, so he was dropped and replaced by Hickman. Mickey Rooney agreed to play a supporting role at $5,000 for one week's work to pay off some tax debts.

Filming started April 12, 1965, and took 15 days. It was the only film in the series where John Ashley sang lead male vocals.

Funicello was pregnant during shooting and was shot mostly wearing blousy tunics or with a prop in front of her (e.g., a bowl of popcorn, a bucket of Kentucky Fried Chicken). She wrote in her memoirs that her pregnancy and Avalon's absence made this one of her least-favorite beach-party movies. The film featured the only big-screen appearance by The Kingsmen, who performed "Give Her Lovin' ".

Elizabeth Montgomery, who at the time was married to the film's director, William Asher, made a cameo appearance in the closing scenes as the witch doctor's daughter, a woman with her own magical powers. Montgomery was instantly recognizable during this period as the star of the hit TV sitcom Bewitched, also directed by Asher, so this small film role was a parody of her TV role.

The opening credits were done using clay animation done by Art Clokey, the creator of Gumby.

Reception
Variety called it a "lightweight affair lacking the breeziness and substance of earlier entries." The critic from the Los Angeles Times called the movie a "breezy number". The New York Times said it was "the answer to a moron's prayer."

Soundtrack

How To Stuff A Wild Bikini, the soundtrack for the film, was released in 1965. Most of the songs are performed by various cast members, with two numbers by The Kingsmen.  The album was released in both mono (WDM 671) and stereo (WDS 671) versions, with the latter being very scarce.  The stereo release was reissued on CD by Real Gone Music in July 2014.

Track listing

All songs written by Guy Hemric & Jerry Styner except "Give Her Lovin' " by Lynn Easton.  Songs are in slightly different order from the movie.

Production credits
 Producer: American International
 Publisher: DiJon Music
 Liner notes: Joe Bogart and Frank Costa (WMCA Music Department)

Home media
In 2001, How to Stuff a Wild Bikini was released by MGM on Region 1 DVD. Since its initial DVD release, the film has been included in two box sets, Frankie & Annette MGM Movie Legends Collection and Midnite Movies Double Feature, along with selected Beach Party films.

Olive Films released a Blu-Ray of How to Stuff a Wild Bikini on June 25, 2019.

See also
 List of American films of 1965

References

External links
 
 
 
 
 
 Soundtrack album at Beach Party Movie Music
 
 How to Stuff a Wild Bikini at Brian's Drive-In Theatre
 Record World album review, September 4, 1965 issue.

1965 films
1965 musical comedy films
1965 romantic comedy films
1960s teen films
American International Pictures films
American musical comedy films
American romantic comedy films
American romantic musical films
American sequel films
Beach party films
Bikinis
Columbia Pictures films
1960s English-language films
Films directed by William Asher
Films scored by Les Baxter
Films set in French Polynesia
Teensploitation
1960s American films
Films about witch doctors